San Luis Talpa is a municipality in the La Paz department of El Salvador. It is close to Monseñor Óscar Arnulfo Romero International Airport, which itself is about eight kilometres from the capital, San Salvador.

Gallery 

Municipalities of the La Paz Department (El Salvador)